Ji Chunhua (20 July 1961 – 11 July 2018), sometimes romanized as Gai Chun Wa, was a Chinese actor and action choreographer. Just like Jet Li and Yu Chenghui, he was a Mainland China-trained wushu athlete who started his acting career in the 1982 Hong Kong martial arts blockbuster Shaolin Temple.

Ji had alopecia totalis and often appeared as bald villains in movies (many starring Jet Li) and TV series.

Filmography

Films

Television series

References 
  计春华一改戏路触电演好人 不反对女儿学武术

External links 
 
 

Male actors from Hangzhou
1961 births
2018 deaths